Novaya Uda is the name of several rural localities in Russia:
Novaya Uda, Irkutsk Oblast, a selo in Ust-Udinsky District of Irkutsk Oblast
Novaya Uda, Republic of Mordovia, a selo in Atemarsky Selsoviet of Lyambirsky District of the Republic of Mordovia